The Dacryonaemataceae are a family of fungi in the order Dacrymycetales. The family currently contains the single genus Dacryonaema with three known species from Europe and North America.

References

 
Basidiomycota families